Extension is an unincorporated community in Franklin Parish, Louisiana, United States. Its ZIP code is 71243.

Notable people
Singer and songwriter Richard Berry was born in Extension. He is known for writing one of the world's most recorded songs, "Louie Louie."

Notes

Unincorporated communities in Franklin Parish, Louisiana
Unincorporated communities in Louisiana